Big Life Fix is an English television show from the BBC that broadcasts since 2018. In this television show makers (engineers, designers, scientists and developers) create creative and concrete solutions for problems that people with disabilities encounter on a daily basis. This format is created by Studio Lambert.

International variants 
 Team Scheire, a Belgium variant of the Big Life Fix
 The big life fix Ireland

References

Disability in the United Kingdom
2018 British television series debuts
Television shows about disability